The Second Death is a 2000 Irish short film written and directed by John Michael McDonagh, and starring Liam Cunningham. The film is McDonagh's film debut as both writer and director.

Plot 

James Mangan (Liam Cunningham), a middle-aged alcoholic, returns from his local pub when he hears a voice from his past and comes to realise he is doomed.

Cast 

 Liam Cunningham - James Mangan
 Michelle Fairley - Aisling
 Aidan Gillen - Pool player 1
 Owen Sharpe - Pool player 2
 David Wilmot - Chess player 1
 Dermot Healy - Chess player 2
 Gary Lydon - Gerry Stanton
 Roxanna Nic Liam - Helen Rainey (as Roxanna Williams)

Cunningham, Fairley, and Gillen would all later star together in Game of Thrones.

References

External links 

 The Second Death (2000) - YouTube

Films directed by John Michael McDonagh
Films shot in the Republic of Ireland
Irish drama films
Irish short films
2000 short films
2000s English-language films